State Highway 136 (abbreviated SH-136) is a state highway in Oklahoma. SH-136 does not have any letter-suffixed spur routes branching from it, however, it does have a truck route bypassing downtown Guymon.

State Highway 136 was designated as such to match the number of the Texas state highway to which it connects.

Route description
It runs north  to Guymon, where it joins US-64, US-412 and SH-3 through the city. The routes divide five miles (8 km) north of Guymon, after crossing the Beaver River, with Highway 136 running uninterrupted the remaining  to the Kansas line.

Junction list

References

External links
 SH-136 at OKHighways.com

136
Transportation in Texas County, Oklahoma